Fred Oscar "Fritz" Loven (June 11, 1894 – November 1, 1975) was an American football player. He played professional football in the National Football League (NFL) as a guard for the Minneapolis Red Jackets. He appeared in eight NFL games, five as a starter, during the 1929 season.

The 80-acre Fritz Loven Park in Lake Shore, Minnesota, is named after Loven. Loven lived for 43 years in a cabin on the property.

References

1894 births
1975 deaths
Minneapolis Red Jackets players
Players of American football from Minnesota
People from Minneapolis